Oleg Kutscherenko, also known as Oleh Kucherenko (born December 20, 1968), is a Ukrainian and German wrestler, born in the Ukrainian SSR, Soviet Union. The Ensign of the Reserves Oleh Kucherenko represented the Ukrainian Armed Forces. He won an Olympic gold medal in Greco-Roman wrestling in 1992, competing for the Unified Team and the Ukrainian Armed Forces. He competed for Germany at the 1996 Olympics.

References

External links

1968 births
Living people
People from Krasnyi Luch
Ukrainian male sport wrestlers
Olympic wrestlers of the Unified Team
Wrestlers at the 1992 Summer Olympics
Wrestlers at the 1996 Summer Olympics
German male sport wrestlers
Olympic gold medalists for the Unified Team
Olympic medalists in wrestling
Olympic wrestlers of Germany
Soviet male sport wrestlers
Ukrainian emigrants to Germany
World Wrestling Championships medalists
Medalists at the 1992 Summer Olympics
Sportspeople from Luhansk Oblast